Radnor station may refer to:

 Radnor station (SEPTA Regional Rail)
 Radnor station (NHSL)